Adán Amezcua [ah-mess'-coo-ah] (born March 9, 1974) is a Mexican professional baseball player. Listed at 6' 3" (1.90 m), 198 lb. (90 k), he bats and throws right handed.

Career
Through the years, Amezcua has established himself as one of the most distinguished catchers in Mexican baseball history. Though he never has played in a Major League game, Amezcua has spent more than two decades in the minor leagues while playing in part or all of 21 seasons spanning 1993–2013.

A fine handler of pitchers, he is known for his fine defense, as well for his ability to call a game and frame pitches to influence an umpire's strike zone. Besides, he has showed off a strong arm with fast release and accuracy backed up by a great instinct of the game. He is equally competent as a line drive hitter with occasional power, and works the count to give other hitter opportunities to see the pitcher.

A native of Mazatlán, Sinaloa, he was born as Adán Amezcua Magallón to parents of Basque origin. He was signed as a 19-year-old by the Houston Astros organization in 1993, playing for them eight years before joining the Baltimore Orioles (2000–2001) and San Diego Padres (2002) systems, reaching Triple-A level with the Rochester Red Wings in the International League and the Portland Beavers of the Pacific Coast League.

Amezcua has also played from 1997 in the Mexican League, most prominently for the Sultanes de Monterrey, winning a title with the team in the 2007 season. In addition, he helped the Tomateros de Culiacán win the 2001–2002 Mexican Pacific League championship. As the league champions, the team represented Mexico in the 2002 Caribbean Series. And Amezcua excelled in the tournament, guiding Culiacán to the Series title after hitting .455 with three home runs and nine RBI, to claim MVP honors and an All-Star team selection.

He returned to the Series in its 2004 edition with Culiacán and was named to the All-Star team for a second time. In 2005, with the Tomateros eliminated in the playoffs, Amezcua reinforced the Venados de Mazatlán in the 2005 Caribbean Series. His contribution was creditable without being notable, as the Mexican representative team captured the title. At the end he received a high praise for his work with the pitching staff, which included Francisco Campos (2-0, 23 strikeouts, 1.13 ERA), Jorge Campillo (1-0, 0.00 ERA) and Pablo Ortega (1-0, 1.13 ERA).

Having caught more than 1200 games in his career, Amezcua has collected a very solid .984 fielding average and nailed 35 percent of potential base-stealers (319 of 582). An extremely productive hitter in terms of a catcher, he has amassed a slash line (BA/OBP/SLG) of .284/.360/.424 in 1264 games.

At 39, Amezcua joined the Tigres de Quintana Roo in the 2013 Mexican League season. He posted a .294/.402/.511 line in 81 games, including 10 homers and 81 RBI. After that, he completed a streak of 21 straight seasons with the Tomateros de Culiacán, a record for most consecutive seasons played for the same club in Mexican baseball history.

Entering 2014, Amezcua has not indicated an intention to retire.

Sources

External links
Baseball Reference
Mexican League career statistics

1974 births
Living people
Auburn Astros players
Baseball players from Sinaloa
Bowie Baysox players
Broncos de Reynosa players
Delfines de Ciudad del Carmen players
Gulf Coast Astros players
Jackson Generals (Texas League) players
Kissimmee Cobras players
Mexican expatriate baseball players in the United States
Mexican League baseball catchers
Mobile BayBears players
Sportspeople from Mazatlán
Portland Beavers players
Quad Cities River Bandits players
Rieleros de Aguascalientes players
Rochester Red Wings players
Sultanes de Monterrey players
Tigres de Quintana Roo players
Tigres del México players
Tomateros de Culiacán players
Tuneros de San Luis Potosí players